Tomás León Goyoaga Palacios (28 June 1898 – 14 November 1937) was a Chilean pée, foil and sabre fencer. He competed at the 1928 and 1936 Summer Olympics.

References

1898 births
1937 deaths
Chilean male épée fencers
Olympic fencers of Chile
Fencers at the 1928 Summer Olympics
Fencers at the 1936 Summer Olympics
Chilean male foil fencers
Chilean male sabre fencers
20th-century Chilean people